G. Nanjundan ( – December 2019) was an Indian academic and writer. He was conferred Sahitya Akademi Award for Tamil Translation in 2012. He was a professor of Bangalore University's statistics department.

Biography
Nanjundan was a professor of Bangalore University's statistics department. He was involved in teaching for over 32 years. He had more than 10 publications, too.

Nanjundan translated several Kannada books into Tamil. He translated more than 12 books from Kannada to Tamil. He was awarded  Sahitya Akademi Award for Tamil Translation in 2012 for translation of Akka from Kannada into Tamil titled Akka. The original book was the short story collections of several women writers. He also translated Bhava and Avaste into Tamil which were written by U. R. Ananthamurthy.

Nanjundan was found dead on 21 December 2019 in his apartment.

References

1960s births
2019 deaths
Indian translators
Recipients of the Sahitya Akademi Award in Tamil
Academic staff of Bangalore University
Translators from Kannada
Translators to Tamil
20th-century translators
Recipients of the Sahitya Akademi Prize for Translation